South West Bedfordshire is a constituency represented in the House of Commons of the UK Parliament. As with all constituencies of the UK Parliament, it elects one Member of Parliament (MP)  by the first past the post system of election.

The serving Member since 2001 is Conservative Andrew Selous, who succeeded Conservative David Madel. Selous has been re-elected five times: in 2005, 2010, 2015, 2017 and 2019.

Constituency profile 

At the 2011 Census, the population of the constituency was 102,031, of whom 50,277 were male, and 51,754 were female. 74.30% of residents aged 16–74 are economically active, including 4.22% unemployed. A further 13.27% of the population are retired (lower than both the regional average of 14.4% and national average of 13.7%), and 3.75% are students. A statistical compilation by The Guardian showed unemployment benefits claimants in the constituency for April 2013 were 3.3% of the population, lower than the regional average of 3.6%.

Turnout at the 2015 general election was 51,304, or 64.4% of those eligible to vote; lower than the national turnout of 66.4%. This rose at the time of the 2017 general election to 55,635, or 69.8% of those eligible to vote, which was a percentage point higher than the national turnout of 68.8%.

History
The constituency was created in 1983, mostly from the former seat of South Bedfordshire.  It was represented by Sir David Madel, a Conservative, from its creation until his retirement in 2001; he almost suffered one of the biggest upsets of the 1997 general election, when the Labour candidate spectacularly slashed his majority from 21,273 in 1992 to just 132.

The present Conservative MP for the seat is Andrew Selous; he won the seat in 2001, when he managed to increase the party's majority, but only just: this increased somewhat more substantially each time in 2005 and 2010, ultimately to more than 16,000.  The 2010 election also saw the second-placed candidate's party change, to the Liberal Democrats, similar to the results of 1983 and 1987, when this was the joint platform for R. Byfield and J.R. Burrow respectively, the (SDP-Liberal Alliance).

Boundaries

1983–1997: The District of South Bedfordshire wards of Beaudesert, Brooklands, Dunstable Central, Eaton Bray, Heath and Reach, Hockliffe, Houghton Central, Houghton East, Houghton South, Icknield, Kensworth, Linslade, Northfields, Plantation, Priory, Southcott, Stanbridge, Studham, Totternhoe, and Watling, and the District of Mid Bedfordshire wards of Aspley, Cranfield, Marston, and Woburn.

New County Constituency formed largely from the bulk of the abolished County Constituency of South Bedfordshire, including Dunstable, Leighton Buzzard and Linslade.  Also included south-western part of Mid Bedfordshire.

1997–2010: The District of South Bedfordshire wards of Beaudesert, Brooklands, Dunstable Central, Eaton Bray, Heath and Reach, Hockliffe, Houghton Central, Houghton East, Houghton South, Icknield, Kensworth, Linslade, Northfields, Plantation, Priory, Southcott, Stanbridge, Studham, Totternhoe, and Watling.

Northern parts transferred back to Mid Bedfordshire.

2010–present: Central Bedfordshire unitary authority wards of All Saints, Chiltern, Dunstable Central, Eaton Bray, Grovebury, Heath and Reach, Houghton Hall, Icknield, Kensworth and Totternhoe, Linslade, Manshead, Northfields, Parkside, Planets, Plantation, Southcott, Stanbridge, Tithe Farm, and Watling.

Local authority wards revised, but no changes to boundaries.

Members of Parliament

Elections

Elections in the 2010s

Elections in the 2000s

Elections in the 1990s

Elections in the 1980s

See also 
List of parliamentary constituencies in Bedfordshire

Notes

References

Parliamentary constituencies in Bedfordshire
Constituencies of the Parliament of the United Kingdom established in 1983